Bleiblerville is an unincorporated community in northern Austin County, Texas, United States. According to the Handbook of Texas, its population was 71 in 2000. It is located within the Greater Houston metropolitan area.

History
Bleiblerville was named for Robert Bleibler, a Swiss immigrant, who ran the general store, post office, and saloon. Bleibler opened the general store in the area in the late 1880s.  The community grew rapidly with the influx of many German immigrants in the late nineteenth century, and its post office was established in 1891. The community expanded in the 1960s with the increase of oil drilling in the community, in which it had 225 residents in 1966, but has since declined to 71 in 1972 and remained at that level through 2000. Theodore Wehring operated a cotton gin in the community in 1900. The American Red Cross had a chapter in the community during World War I that included ten black residents in its roster of 68 members. It had a population of 101 in 1904, which grew to 150 by 1925. It had four businesses in 1931.

Although Bleiblerville is unincorporated, it has a post office, with the ZIP code of 78931.

Geography
Bleiblerville addresses extend northwest along FM 2502 as far as the FM 109 intersections, but only a short distance to the southeast. The Bleiblerville postal zone extends as far as Industry Road and Begonia Lane to the southwest and Bleiblerville and West Uekert Roads to the northeast.

Education
The school in nearby Welcome is located a mile north of Bleiblerville on Farm to Market Road 2502. Today, the community is served by the Bellville Independent School District.

References

Unincorporated communities in Austin County, Texas
Unincorporated communities in Texas